Ngan Dừa is a township (Thị trấn) and town and capital of Hồng Dân District, Bạc Liêu Province, in south-western Vietnam.

History of Ngan Dừa
The town was founded before 1940, then burned down in the battle for independence from the French colonial forces. People left until 1955 when a new village was built. Ngan Dừa was the heart of the community and became the center of distribution and business for the others villages.

After re-establishing Ngan Dừa, schools were built and opened for students from elementary to middle school. High school students were admitted in September 1964.

Ngan Dừa has been part of Hồng Dân District since 25 September 2000.

References

Populated places in Bạc Liêu province
Communes of Bạc Liêu province
District capitals in Vietnam
Townships in Vietnam